Rakta Bandhan is a 1984 Hindi-language film directed by Rajat Rakshit, starring Mithun Chakraborty (in a double role), Rati Agnihotri, Surinder Kaur and Dina Pathak Jagdeep in a supporting role.

Plot 
A mother gives birth to twin children, naming one Chandan and the other Kundan. Durjan Singh who was a dacoit loots and burns their house. They also take Kundan separating the brothers. Chandan is mentally challenged and stays with his mother and his sister in a village. Kundan is brought up by dacoits and changed his to Trishul Singh. Kundan becomes a dacoit.

Chandan becomes a worker of Dharmadas and collects some money. Kundan stayed with the dacoit in a forest and killed people to rob them. Chandan has a lover, a beautiful girl named Roopa. Kallu was a gangster of their village and he wants to molest Chandan's sister. He tortures both of them. One day Trishul Singh's father Durjan Singh fells ill and confesses that he is not Trishul's father, "one day I have looted your house I have kidnapped from you" from a village and dies in front of him. Later on, Trishul Singh goes to rob a married couple's house and kills the husband of a dancer Komabhayee whom he wants to conquer. When he brings her to his side he falls in love and they become a couple. One day Kallu hits Chandan badly. Trishul Singh finds him unconscious and injured and thinks he is dead. He trades clothes with Chandan and thinks the Police will think him dead. Trishul disguises himself as Chandan and stays with his mother without knowing that she is his mother.

It is revealed that Chandan is alive. Trishul's gang finds Chandan in an unconscious condition and mistake him for Trishul. Trishul had been the head of the gang. Chandan behaves very differently and they conclude that he has brain damage. Sardar wants to become the gang leader. He brings Dev, the priest of their village, to help him recover. Chandan identifies Dev and tries to convince him that he is Chandan, but Dev acts as if he doesn't know anything, Dev fears that if he tells the truth they will kill him. Dev returns to the village and tells Kallu that Trishul is pretending to be Chandan. Kallu kills Dev. The gang discovers that Chandan is not Trishul. Sardar tries to kill Chandan. Chandan realizes that he has a twin brother. One day their mother tells Trishul what happened when they were children. Trishul realizes that Chandan is his twin brother. Komabhayee tells Trishul that Sardar had planned to kill Chandan. Trishul goes to save his brother. Kallu follows and tries to kill him, but Trishul kills him. Komabhayee tells Chandan that his brother is still alive and Chandan figures out that Trishul is his twin. When Sardar tries to shoot Chandan ,Komabhayee comes between them and gets shot in the stomach. She grabs a trident and stabs Sardar and kills him. Trishul arrives and the brothers hug each other. Trishul kills Komabhayee.

For their sister's wedding, Trishul sends Chandan to the marriage hall to make everything ready. The police appear. Trishul tries to escape, but the police shoot him. He comes to the marriage hall. Chandan sees that Trishul is in critical condition. Trishul convinces him to go back to the wedding. Trishul surrenders to the police and they tell him to come with them but he asks to see his sister's face one last time. After seeing his sister's face Trishul feels satisfaction and dies before the police can take him away.

Cast 

 Mithun Chakraborty as Chandan / Kundan a.k.a. Trishul Singh (dual role)
 Rati Agnihotri as Roopa, Chandan's girlfriend
 Sadhna Singh as Sona; Chandan and Kundan's sister
 Jagdeep as Bhola
 Leela Mishra
 Mukri as Dharmdas
 Dina Pathak as Chandan's mother
 Birbal as Kallu
 Dinesh Hingoo as Munimji of Dharmadas
 Shubha Khote as Bhola's mother
 Surinder Kaur as Komabhai
 Viju Khote as Police Inspector
 Jankidas

Songs

References

External links 
 

1980s Hindi-language films
1984 films
Films scored by Usha Khanna
Twins in Indian films